Love the Hard Way is a 2001 crime drama film directed by . It is about the story of a petty thief who meets an innocent young woman and brings her into his world of crime while she teaches him the lessons of enjoying life and being loved.

Cast
 Adrien Brody as Jack
 Charlotte Ayanna as Claire
 Jon Seda as Charlie
 Pam Grier as Linda
 August Diehl as Jeff
 Liza Jessie Peterson as Pamela
 Elizabeth Regen as Sue
 Katherine Moennig as Debbie
 Joey Kern as Fitzgerald
 Jonathan Hadary as Boris
 Michaela Conlin as Cara
 James Saito as Ahiri

References

External links 
 
 
 

2001 films
2001 crime drama films
2001 romantic drama films
Films based on Chinese novels
Films set in New York (state)
German crime drama films
English-language German films
American romantic drama films
American crime drama films
2000s American films
2000s German films